The R524 road is a regional road in Ireland which links Glin with Athea in County Limerick.

See also 

 Roads in Ireland
 National primary road
 National secondary road

References 

Regional roads in the Republic of Ireland
Roads in County Limerick